Brenner Field  is a public use airport located one nautical miles (1.6 km) northeast of the central business district of Falls City, a city in Richardson County, Nebraska, United States.

Facilities and aircraft 
It has one runway: 15/33 is 5,489 by 60 feet (1,219 x 18 m) with a concrete surface. For the 12-month period ending May 26, 2011, the airport had 4,470 aircraft operations, an average of 12 per day: 99% general aviation, and <1% military.

References

External links 
 

Airports in Nebraska
Buildings and structures in Richardson County, Nebraska